Siam Sunset is a 1999 Australian comedy film directed by John Polson and starring Linus Roache and Danielle Cormack.

Plot
Perry (Linus Roache) is an English chemist working for a paint company and is depressed after losing his wife in a freak accident. As he tries to invent the new color Siam Sunset, he wins a prize, takes leave, and travels to Australia. Grace (Danielle Cormack), on the same tour bus, also has a troubled life. When they meet, the two begin a romance.

Release
Siam Sunset premiered at the 1999 Cannes Film Festival.  It grossed $878,819 at the box office in Australia,.

Reception
Rotten Tomatoes reports that 67% of nine surveyed critics gave the film a positive review; the average rating is 6.1/10.  David Stratton of Variety wrote that the film's concept is unoriginal, but it is a "merrily entertaining, frequently funny and occasionally violent" film that improves on the formula used by recent films.

References

External links

Siam Sunset' at Oz Movies

1999 films
1999 comedy films
Australian comedy films
1990s English-language films
Films shot in South Australia
Films directed by John Polson
1999 directorial debut films
1990s Australian films